Bransby is both a given name and a surname. Notable people with the name include:

Given name:
Bransby Cooper (1844–1914), Australian cricketer
Bransby Key (1838–1901), South African Anglican bishop
Bransby Williams (1870–1961), British actor, comedian and monologist
Eric Bransby Williams (1900–1994), British actor

Surname:
Bruce Bransby, American double-bassist
Eric Bransby (1916-2020), American artist
James Hews Bransby (1783–1847), English Unitarian minister
Lawrence Bransby (born 1951), South African writer